Jana Messerschmidt is a German karateka. In 2019, she won one of the bronze medals in the women's kumite 55 kg event at the 2019 European Games held in Minsk, Belarus.
In 2018, she won the silver medal in the women's kumite 55 kg event at the 2018 World Karate Championships held in Madrid.
Her brother Noah Bitsch, is one of the best athletes in
men’s kumite 75 kg. She also has a younger sister. Mia Bitsch is No.1 in the world ranking 14-15years -53 kg.

She competed in the women's kumite 55 kg at the 2022 World Games held in Birmingham, United States.

Achievements

References

External links 
 

Living people
Place of birth missing (living people)
German female karateka
European Games medalists in karate
European Games bronze medalists for Germany
Karateka at the 2019 European Games
1990 births
Competitors at the 2022 World Games
20th-century German women
21st-century German women